Mathias Schwerbrock  (born in Cologne, North Rhine-Westphalia, Germany) is a producer, director, writer, and line producer. He is the founder of the film company Film Base Berlin GmbH, which co-produced the internationally acclaimed film Don 2.

Schwerbrock has produced over 20 projects, wrote, directed and served as line producer on several films.

Credits

References

External links 

Film people from Cologne
Living people
German male writers
1960 births